Horn is the fourth Korean studio album and  by South Korean girl group Apink. Marketed as "special album", it contains eleven tracks, including the 2021 single "Thank You" and the lead single "Dilemma". The album was released by IST Entertainment on February 14, 2022. It was the group's last album to feature group member Naeun, who withdrew from the group on April 8, 2022.

Background and release
On December 22, 2021, IST Entertainment announced Apink would be releasing a new album in February 2022. On January 18, 2022, it was announced by YG Entertainment member Son Na-eun would not be participating in the album promotional activities with exception of filming for the album jacket and music video due "to difficulties in coordinating the schedule for her next project under discussion". On January 22, it was announced that Apink would be releasing Horn on February 14. The album was marketed as "special album" by IST Entertainment. Four days later, the track listing consisting of 11 tracks including previously released single "Thank You" and lead single "Dilemma" was released. On February 7, the highlight medley teaser video was released. The music video for "Dilemma" was released on February 11 and 13.

Commercial performance
Horn debuted at number four on South Korea's Gaon Album Chart in the chart issue dated February 13–19, 2022; on the monthly chart, the album debuted at number nine in the chart issue for February 2022 with 49,598 copies sold.

Promotion
Following the release of the album, Apink held a live showcase on YouTube to introduce the album and communicate with their fans. The group then performed "Dilemma", "Nothing", and "Red Carpet" on Mnet's M Countdown on February 17.

Track listing

Notes
 "Holy Moly" is stylized in all caps.

Charts

Weekly charts

Monthly charts

Release history

References

2022 albums
Apink albums
Korean-language albums